Axel Kammerer (born 21 July 1964) is a German former ice hockey player. He competed in the men's tournament at the 1992 Winter Olympics.

References

External links
 

1964 births
Living people
Olympic ice hockey players of Germany
Ice hockey players at the 1992 Winter Olympics
People from Bad Tölz
Sportspeople from Upper Bavaria